Silvestre Hernando Bello III (born June 23, 1944) is a Filipino businessman and lawyer from Isabela, who served as the Secretary of the Philippines' Department of Labor and Employment, and concurrently Presidential Adviser on the Peace Process, under the Duterte administration. Bello was appointed by President Rodrigo Duterte to replace Rosalinda Baldoz in the secretaryship. 

Bello was a former Justice Secretary, Solicitor General and representative of 1-BAP party-list during the 16th Congress of the Philippines. 

In July 2022, he presented his credentials to President Tsai Ing-wen in July 2022 as Philippine Ambassador to Taiwan.

Early life and education 
Bello was born in Gattaran, Cagayan on June 23, 1944. He is married to Regina Gerona. He obtained his Bachelor of Arts in Political Science from Manuel L. Quezon University in Quiapo, Manila, in 1966. He earned his Bachelor of Laws from Ateneo de Manila University Law School in 1970.

Career
Bello worked in private practice in the 1970s and 1980s and became active in several civic and human rights groups during the Marcos dictatorship such as the Free Legal Assistance Group (FLAG), the Justice for Aquino, Justice for All (JAJA) Movement, the Coalition of Organizations For The Restoration of Democracy and the Coalition For The Protection of Workers’ Rights. He was appointed by then President Corazon Aquino as an undersecretary of the Department of Justice from 1986 to 1991. Bello has worked as Justice Secretary from 1991 to February 1992 when he resigned to run for the Senate as a candidate of Fidel V. Ramos' Lakas-CMD party in the May 1992 elections, which he lost. He was then appointed to several government positions by President Ramos such as the government negotiating panel during peace talks with the CPP-NPA-NDF before running again in 1995 for governor of Isabela but lost to Benjamin Dy. He was then reappointed by President Ramos as Solicitor General from September 23, 1996, until February 3, 1998 when he was reappointed Secretary of Justice. In June of that year he was also concurrently reappointed as Solicitor General which he occupied until the end of Ramos' presidency on June 30. 

He was the Chairman of the Government Negotiating Panel for Talks with the CPP-NPA-NDF from January 2001 to August 2004. He served as president and CEO of PNOC Development and Management Corporation from November 2004 to December 2005. From January 2006 to December 2006 he was the General Manager and CEO of PRA. He was a presidential adviser for New Government Centers from July 2007 to July 2008. He served as Cabinet Secretary during the presidency of Gloria Macapagal Arroyo.

References

|-

|-

|-

|-

|-

|-

|-

|-

1944 births
20th-century Filipino lawyers
Living people
Secretaries of Labor and Employment of the Philippines
Secretaries of Justice of the Philippines
Solicitors General of the Philippines
Cabinet Secretaries of the Philippines
People from Cagayan
People from Quezon City
Manuel L. Quezon University alumni
Ateneo de Manila University alumni
Corazon Aquino administration cabinet members
Ramos administration cabinet members
Arroyo administration cabinet members
Duterte administration cabinet members
Presidential Advisers on the Peace Process of the Philippines
Heads of government-owned and controlled corporations of the Philippines
Party-list members of the House of Representatives of the Philippines